Baby is the seventh studio album by the band Yello, released in 1991 under the label Mercury. An early cut of the album was used as the incidental soundtrack for the film The Adventures of Ford Fairlane.

Track listing
All tracks by Blank/Meier except where noted.
 "Homage to the Mountain" – 0:35
 "Rubberbandman" – 3:37
 "Jungle Bill" – 6:12
 "Ocean Club" – 3:29
 "Who's Gone?" – 3:41
 "Capri Calling" (Blank, Mackenzie, Meier) – 3:02
 "Drive/Driven" – 4:16
 "On the Run" – 4:39
 "Blender" – 4:36
 "Sweet Thunder" – 5:27

Personnel
Yello
 Boris Blank – background vocals, arrangements, engineering, mixing
 Dieter Meier – vocals
with:
 Billy Mackenzie - vocals, background vocals
 Marco Colombo – guitar
 Ernst Gamper – guitar, cover design
 Rolf Aschwander – accordion
 Beat Ash – percussion
 Kevin Metcalfe – mastering
 En Soie Zurich – wardrobe

Charts

Weekly charts

Year-end charts

Singles

References

1991 albums
Yello albums
Mercury Records albums
Vertigo Records albums